Powys is the largest administrative county in Wales. With an over a quarter of Wales's land area, covering much of the eastern half of the country, it is a county of remote uplands, low population and no coastline. It was created in more or less its current form in 1974, and is the only one of the large county units created at that time to have been carried forward intact at the 1996 local government re-organisation. It comprises three historic counties, namely Montgomeryshire, Radnorshire,  and most of Brecknockshire. There are 950 scheduled monuments within the county, which is far more than can be sensibly covered in one list. Each of the 3 historic counties is therefore listed separately, and each of these has two lists - one for the prehistoric sites and one for the Roman, medieval and post-medieval sites.

This list shows the sites dating to Roman, medieval and post-medieval times in Montgomeryshire, which occupies the northern third of Powys. Of the 303 scheduled monuments in Montgomeryshire, 190 date to prehistoric times. The 113 on this list include 16 Roman sites, most of which related to the military occupation of Wales. The 25 Early Medieval include 16 sections of Offa's Dyke, along with other dykes and an inscribed stone. The 62 medieval sites are overwhelmingly defensive structures, particularly mottes, but also including castles, settlements, town defences and a gallows. The ten post-medieval sites include mines, bridges, agricultural features and a railway.

The lists of Scheduled Monuments in Powys are as follows:-
 List of Scheduled prehistoric Monuments in Powys (Brecknockshire) (254 sites)
 List of Scheduled Roman to modern Monuments in Powys (Brecknockshire) (135 sites)
 List of Scheduled prehistoric Monuments in Powys (Radnorshire) (139 sites)
 List of Scheduled Roman to modern Monuments in Powys (Radnorshire) (119 sites - shown below)
 List of Scheduled prehistoric Monuments in Powys (Montgomeryshire) (190 sites)
 List of Scheduled Roman to modern Monuments in Powys (Montgomeryshire) (113 sites)

Scheduled Ancient Monuments (SAMs) have statutory protection. It is illegal to disturb the ground surface or any standing remains. The compilation of the list is undertaken by Cadw Welsh Historic Monuments, which is an executive agency of the National Assembly of Wales. The list of scheduled monuments below is supplied by Cadw with additional material from RCAHMW and Clwyd-Powys Archaeological Trust.

Scheduled Roman, medieval and post-medieval monuments in Montgomeryshire
The list is sorted by period, and then by Community so that sites of similar age and locality are placed near each other. Clicking on the heading arrows will sort the list by that information.

See also
List of Cadw properties
List of castles in Wales
List of hill forts in Wales
Historic houses in Wales
List of monastic houses in Wales
List of museums in Wales
List of Roman villas in Wales

References
Coflein is the online database of RCAHMW: Royal Commission on the Ancient and Historical Monuments of Wales, CPAT is the Clwyd-Powys Archaeological Trust, Cadw is the Welsh Historic Monuments Agency

Powys
Buildings and structures in Powys